Sweetwater County School District #2 is a public school district based in Green River, Wyoming, United States.

Geography
Sweetwater County School District #2 serves the southwestern portion of Sweetwater County, including the following communities:

Incorporated places
Town of Granger
City of Green River
Census-designated places (Note: All census-designated places are unincorporated.)
James Town
Little America
McKinnon
Purple Sage (partial)
Sweeney Ranch (partial)
Washam

Schools
Green River Schools (within the city limits)
Green River High School
Expedition Academy
Lincoln Middle School
Monroe Intermediate School
Harrison Elementary School
Jackson Elementary School
Truman Elementary School
Washington Elementary School
Rural Schools
Granger Elementary School
McKinnon Elementary School
Thoman Ranch Elementary School

Student demographics
The following figures are as of October 1, 2008.

Total District Enrollment: 2,671
Student enrollment by gender
Male: 1,388 (51.97%)
Female: 1,283 (48.03%)
Student enrollment by ethnicity
White (not Hispanic): 2,220 (83.11%)
Hispanic: 368 (13.78%)
American Indian or Alaskan Native: 35 (1.31%)
Asian or Pacific Islander: 30 (1.12%)
Black (not Hispanic): 18 (0.67%)

See also
List of school districts in Wyoming

References

External links
Official Sweetwater County School District #2 website

Education in Sweetwater County, Wyoming
Green River, Wyoming
School districts in Wyoming